The Accra Riots started on 28 February 1948 in Accra, the capital of present-day Ghana, which at the time was the British colony of the Gold Coast. A protest march by unarmed ex-servicemen who were agitating for their benefits as veterans of World War II was broken up by police, leaving three leaders of the group dead. Among those killed was Sergeant Nii Adjetey, who has since been memorialized in Accra. 

The 28 February incident is considered "the straw that broke the camel's back", marking the beginning of the process of the Gold Coast becoming the first African colony to achieve independence, becoming Ghana on 6 March 1957.

Background 

In January 1948, the Ga chief, Nii Kwabena Bonne III, known in private life as Theodore Taylor (1888–1968), had organized a boycott of all European imports in response to their inflated prices. 
The boycott's aim was to press the foreign traders known as the Association of West African Merchants (AWAM) to reduce the inflated prices of their goods. The boycott was followed by a series of riots in early February 1948. The day the boycott was scheduled to end, 28 February, coincided with a march by veterans of World War II.

28 February march and riot

The march on 28 February 1948 was a peaceful attempt by former soldiers to bring a petition to the Governor of the Gold Coast requesting the dispensation of promised pensions and other compensation for their efforts during the war. The ex-servicemen were members of the Gold Coast Regiment, who were among the most decorated African soldiers, having fought alongside British troops in Burma. They had been promised pensions and jobs after the war; however, when they returned home, jobs were scarce and their pensions were never disbursed. 

As the group marched toward the Governor's residence at Christiansborg Castle, they were stopped and confronted by the colonial police, who refused to let them pass. The British police Superintendent Imray ordered his subordinate to shoot at the protesters, but the man did not. Possibly in panic, Imray grabbed the gun and shot at the leaders, killing three former soldiers: Sergeant Adjetey, Corporal Attipoe, and Private Odartey Lamptey. Apart from the three fatalities, a further 60 ex-servicemen were wounded.

People in Accra took to the streets in riot. On the same day, the local political leadership, the United Gold Coast Convention (UGCC), led by the Big Six, sent a cable on the same day to the Secretary of State in London:

"...unless Colonial Government is changed and a new Government of the people and their Chiefs installed at the centre immediately, the conduct of masses now completely out of control with strikes threatened in Police quarters, and rank and file Police indifferent to orders of Officers, will continue and result in worse violent and irresponsible acts by uncontrolled people."

They also blamed the Governor Sir Gerald Creasy (whom they called "Crazy Creasy") for his handling of the country's problems. The UGCC cable further stated: "Working Committee United Gold Coast Convention declare they are prepared and ready to take over interim Government. We ask in name of oppressed, inarticulate, misruled and misgoverned people and their Chiefs that Special Commissioner be sent out immediately to hand over Government to interim Government of Chief and People and to witness immediate calling of Constituent Assembly."

The unrest in Accra, and in other towns and cities, would last for five days, during which both Asian and European-owned stores and businesses were looted and more deaths occurred. By 1 March, the Governor had declared a state of emergency and a new Riot Act was put in place.

Aftermath 

The British colonial government set up the Watson Commission, which examined the circumstances of the riots, and paved the way for constitutional changes that eventually culminated in Ghana's independence.

The immediate aftermath of the riots included the arrest on 12 March 1948 of "the Big Six" – Kwame Nkrumah and other leading activists in the United Gold Coast Convention (UGCC) party (namely Ebenezer Ako-Adjei, Edward Akufo-Addo, J. B. Danquah, Emmanuel Obetsebi-Lamptey and William Ofori Atta), who were held responsible for orchestrating the disturbances and were detained, before being released a month later. The arrest of the leaders of the UGCC raised the profile of the party around the country and made them national heroes.

The Watson Commission reported that the 1946 constitution was inappropriate from the start, because it did not address the concerns of the natives of the Gold Coast. It also recommended that the Gold Coast be allowed to draft its own constitution. A 40-member committee was set up to draft a constitution, with six representatives of the UGCC. The governor excluded "radicals" such as Kwame Nkrumah, among others, from the constitutional drafting committee for fear of drafting a constitution that would demand absolute independence for the colony.

By 1949, Nkrumah had broken away from the UGCC to form the Convention People's Party (CPP), with the motto "Self-government now", and a campaign of "Positive Action". Nkrumah broke away due to misunderstandings at the leadership front of the UGCC. On 6 March 1957, the country achieved its independence and was renamed Ghana, with Nkrumah as its first President.

Notes

References

External links
 "Ghana Veterans and the 1948 Accra Riots", Witness History, BBC World Service, date 7 March 2014.

Accra Riots, 1948
Accra Riots, 1948
20th century in Accra
February 1948 events in Africa
History of Accra
Riots and civil disorder in Ghana